Two Men of Fiji is a 1959 Australian television documentary.  It was directed by Brett Porter for the Shell Film Unit. It was filmed in Fiji over a two-month period and was screened theatrically in Fiji .

Reception
The Sydney Morning Herald said it "freshly and happily captured the spirit of a remote and happy people."

References

External links
 Two Men of Fiji at Australian Screen Online
 Two Men of Fiji at IMDb
 Clip from film at YouTube

Australian television films
Films set in Fiji
1959 films